LZWL is a syllable-based variant of the character-based LZW compression algorithm that can work with syllables obtained by all algorithms of decomposition into syllables. The algorithm can be used for words too.

Algorithm
Algorithm LZWL can work with syllables obtained by all algorithms of decomposition into syllables. This algorithm can be used for words too.

In the initialization step the dictionary is filled up with all characters from the alphabet. In each next step it is searched for the maximal string , which is from the dictionary and matches the prefix of the still non-coded part of the input. The number of phrase  is sent to the output. A new phrase is added to the dictionary. This phrase is created by concatenation of string S and the character that follows  in file.
Decoding has only one situation for solving. We can receive the number of phrase, which is not from the dictionary. In this case we can create that phrase by concatenation of the last added phrase with its first character.

The syllable-based version uses a list of syllables as an alphabet. In the initialization step we add to the dictionary the empty syllable and small syllables from a database of frequent syllables. Finding string  and coding its number is similar to the character-based version, except that string  is a string of syllables. The number of phrase  is encoded to the output. The string  can be the empty syllable.

If  is the empty syllable, then we must get from the file one syllable called  and encode  by methods for coding new syllables. Syllable  is added to the dictionary.

In adding a phrase to the dictionary there is a difference in the character-based version. The phrase from the next step will be called S1. If  and S1 are both non-empty syllables, then we add a new phrase to the dictionary. This solution has two advantages: The first is that strings are not created from syllables that appear only once. The second advantage is that we cannot receive in decoder number of phrase that is not from dictionary.

References

External links
 Detailed description

Lossless compression algorithms